The Kalpasar Project or the Gulf of Khambhat Development Project envisages building a 30 km dam across the Gulf of Khambat in India for establishing a huge fresh water coastal reservoir for irrigation, drinking and industrial purposes. The project with 30 km sea dam will have the capacity to store 10,000 million cubic meters fresh water, equating to 25% of Gujarat’s average annual rainwater flow, from the rivers like Narmada, Mahi, Dhadhar, Sabarmati, Limbdi-Bhagovo, and two other minor rivers. A 10 lane road link will also be set up over the dam, greatly reducing the distance between Saurashtra and South Gujarat. The project, which will create world's largest freshwater lake in marine environment, will cost INR90,000 crore or US$12.75 billion (2015-16 estimates with 8% annual inflation) excluding the cost of tidal power plant. Project entails construction of the main "Kalpasar dam" across Gulf of Khambat and another Bhadbhut barrage on Narmada river, as well as a canal connecting the two.

Spending began in earnest in 2004, and by 2018 INR 250 crore has been spent on various feasibility studies and surveys. By July 2019, 25 of the 43 feasibility studies for the ecological, environmental, social and financial impact, etc were complete; 8 more were underway; remaining 10 surveys will take 3 to 5 years to complete i.e. by 2021-23. Detailed Project Report (DPR) was intended to be completed by the end of 2018. The project, if found feasible, will take at least 20 years (by 2035-38) to complete including 3 to 5 years pre-construction feasibility studies which are presently underway, and further 12 to 15 years of construction thereafter which has not commenced yet. As of 2018, no environmental or other clearances have been obtained for the Kalpasar dam. Meanwhile the construction of the Bhadbhut barrage, which is a smaller component of the project, commenced in 2020.

More than 30,000 MCM of water from Narmada river alone flows out annually into the sea due to the lack of storage capacity and dams, thus experts have been calling for a review of Gujarat's Water Policy to expedite the Kalpasar project.

Background

Etymology 

Kalpasar means a lake that fulfills all the wishes (कल्प+सर). The construction of the word is similar to कल्पवृक्ष, the Hindu mythological ‘Kalpa Vriksha’ (Devanagari: कल्पवृक्ष) – wishing tree.

History

The Gulf of Khambhat was identified as a promising site for tidal power generation by UNDP Expert, Mr. Eric Wilson in the year 1975. Successive governments were then presented in details the possibility of a project, aptly named Kalpasar Project by its visionary Dr. Anil Kane, who conceptualised it in 80s as a feasible project. In 1988–89 a reconnaissance report was prepared for the dam across the Gulf of Khambhat. The report concluded that, assuming sound foundation conditions, the closure of the Gulf was technically feasible. Studies are still going on and the length of the proposed dam is reduced and the tidal power component is dropped. The cost of project is estimated at  85,000 crore as of 2022. It is reported that the project may take 20 years to complete if found feasible and approved.

Project details

Objectives 

Kalpasar aims at the creation of a fresh water coastal reservoir in the Gulf of Khambhat by the construction of a dam connecting the east and west bank of the Gulf. In the reservoir the runoff from Sabarmati, Mahi, Dhadar and Narmada will be stored, together with the waters from the Saurashtra rivers discharging into the Gulf of Khambhat. The stored waters are to be used for irrigation, domestic and industrial water requirements in the Saurashtra region. Kalpasar is considered the evident solution for solving on the short as well as on the long term the threatening drinking and irrigation water problems in Saurashtra.

Once the Gulf is closed, water levels within the reservoir can be controlled while the tidal fluctuation outside the reservoir continues and, hence, can be harnessed for the generation of tidal energy.

In addition to fresh water storage and tidal power generation, Kalpasar also aims at land reclamation, transportation improvements and fisheries development. In accordance with this project, a mega fresh water reservoir will be constructed on the upstream side of the dam by impounding the surplus waters of numerous rivers.

This project, will resolve four vital problems of the State of Gujarat which are water, electrical power, road-rail transport and development of ports.

Scope and cost

Abandoned original plan and scope

The original plan envisaged a larger dam along with a tidal power plant. 

A state government release said the Rs 55,000 crore (US$11.7 billion) project, to be completed by 2020, will have a vast fresh water reservoir with gross storage of 16,791 million cubic metres of water, 64 km long dam across the Gulf of Khambhat connecting Ghogha in Bhavnagar with Hansot in Bharuch District, reducing the distance between the two by 225 km. It will have tidal power generation house with an installed capacity of 5,880 MW. Another estimate was given by the Government in October 2010 which stated the proposed dam to be built just north of Bhavnagar in the west to Alandar in Dahej on the east. In 2017, the revised project plan reduced the size of lake with only 30 km sea dam instead of original plan of 64 km long dam.

Revised and reduced current scope 

In 2017 the scope and size of the dam project was reduced, instead of a longer Kalpasar dam across the Gulf of, it will now have a shorter Kalpasar dam across the Gulf of Khambat along with another Bhadbhut barrage on Narmada river and a canal connecting these two. The Tidal power project has been dropped from the scope, which could be taken up as a separate project.

 Kalpasar dam: The size of Kalpasar dam has been reduced by shifting the alignment towards north, from Kala Talav village in Bhavnagar district to Aladar village north of Port of Dahej in Bharuch district. 

 Bhadbhut barrage: Since the alignment of "Kalpasar dam" has been moved further north, the Narmada river will not flow directly into the Kalpasar dam. Instead Narmada's water will be diverted to Kalpasar dam by constructing another 1.7 km long causeway-cum-weir barrage of 600 million cubic meter storage capacity 25 km upstream of Narmada's mouth before it enters the sea near Bhadbhut in Bharuch district. This barrage help prevent saltwater intrusion in Narmada river.

 Bhadbhut-Kalpasar canal: To transfer the water of narmada river from "Bhadbhut barrage" to "Kalpasar dam", a new 30 km long canal with one lac cusecs watr carrying capacity will be constructed from "Bhadbhut barrage" to "Kalpasar dam".

 Kalpasar irrigation command and channels: Various canals and channels will be built in the Saurashtra to irrigate the farms from "Kalpasar dam".

Issues 
Narmada river one of the 111 waterways in India which facilitate the water transport in India, the currently design of Bhadhut barrage by the Gujarat government would allow only lower capacity class III ships where as the union water transport ministry notification envisages higher capacity class IV ships, consequently union government has asked Gujarat government to upgrade the design of the barrage and shipping locks to facilitate the navigation of larger class IV ships. 

There are other ecological and environmental issues to be addressed as part of various feasibility studies being undertaken.

Current status 
 Planning stage
 1975-2004 Endless wait due to poor planning and slow pace of implementation: Conceived in 1975, reconnaissanced in 1988–89 and with construction expected to commence in 2012, is a much delayed project.

 Feasibility surveys stage
 2004 - spending began on feasibility surveys:, but work was delayed amid questions about feasibility.

 2014-17 - ongoing surveys: The entire Gulf of Khambhat area was undergoing Bathymetric and Land Survey for determining sea bed levels under the supervision of National Institute of Ocean Technology (NIOT, Chennai).

 2019 - 25 surveys out of 43 completed, 8 underway, 10 yet to commence: By July 2019, 25 of the 43 feasibility studies for the ecological, environmental, social and financial impact, etc were complete; 8 more were underway; remaining 10 surveys will take 3 to 5 years to complete i.e. by 2021-23. Detailed Project Report (DPR) was intended to be completed by the end of 2018.

 Construction stage
 Tenders for the "Bhadhut barrage" will be issued by December 2019 and construction will commence in 2020. The construction of main "Kalpasar dam" Will take 12 to 15 years, once the construction commences only after 2021-23.

Other water projects in the area 
In December 2019, Chief Minister Vijaybhai Rupani laid the foundation stone for the 100 MLD water desalination plant in Dahej - which will be operational by 2022 - and 8 more such desalination plants will be built in Gujarat to meet the water needs of the state's industry.

See also

 Similar projects
 Polavaram Project, under construction in India
 Saemangeum Seawall, functional in Korea
 Indian Rivers Inter-link

 Lists
 List of rivers by dissolved load
 List of drainage basins by area
 List of rivers of India by discharge
 List of rivers by discharge
 List of dams and reservoirs in India

 Water management in India
 Environment of India
 Ground water in India
 Interstate River Water Disputes Act
 Irrigation in India
 National Water Policy
 Water scarcity in India
 Water supply and sanitation in India
 Water pollution in India

References 
 Citations

External links 
 

Water supply infrastructure in India
Power stations in Gujarat
Tidal power stations in India
Proposed tidal power stations
Gulf of Khambhat
Dams in Gujarat
Proposed dams in India
Proposed renewable energy power stations in India